Easley is both a surname and a given name. Notable people with the name include:

Surname:
Annie Easley (1933-2011), American computer scientist, mathematician and rocket scientist
Charles Easley, Justice, Mississippi Supreme Court
Damion Easley (born 1969), baseball player
David Easley, Chair of the Economics department at Cornell University
Ed Easley (born 1985), American baseball player
Jeff Easley (born 1954), graphic artist, works in Dungeons and Dragons books
Kenny Easley (born 1959), American football player
Michael Easley (disambiguation), multiple people
Mike Easley (born 1950), politician
Nick Easley (born 1997), American football player
Stephen Easley (1952–2013), American businessman and politician
Walt Easley (1957–2013), American football player

Given name:
Easley Blackwood Sr. (1903–1992), contract bridge player, administrator and author
Easley Blackwood Jr. (born 1933), musician